In geometry, the great snub icosidodecahedron is a nonconvex uniform polyhedron, indexed as U57. It has 92 faces (80 triangles and 12 pentagrams), 150 edges, and 60 vertices. It can be represented by a Schläfli symbol sr{,3}, and Coxeter-Dynkin diagram .

This polyhedron is the snub member of a family that includes the great icosahedron, the great stellated dodecahedron and the great icosidodecahedron.

In the book Polyhedron Models by Magnus Wenninger, the polyhedron is misnamed great inverted snub icosidodecahedron, and vice versa.

Cartesian coordinates 
Cartesian coordinates for the vertices of a great snub icosidodecahedron are all the even permutations of
 (±2α, ±2, ±2β),
 (±(α−βτ−1/τ), ±(α/τ+β−τ), ±(−ατ−β/τ−1)),
 (±(ατ−β/τ+1), ±(−α−βτ+1/τ), ±(−α/τ+β+τ)),
 (±(ατ−β/τ−1), ±(α+βτ+1/τ), ±(−α/τ+β−τ)) and
 (±(α−βτ+1/τ), ±(−α/τ−β−τ), ±(−ατ−β/τ+1)),
with an even number of plus signs, where
 α = ξ−1/ξ
and
 β = −ξ/τ+1/τ2−1/(ξτ),
where τ = (1+)/2 is the golden mean and
ξ is the negative real root of ξ3−2ξ=−1/τ, or approximately −1.5488772.
Taking the odd permutations of the above coordinates with an odd number of plus signs gives another form, the enantiomorph of the other one.

The circumradius for unit edge length is

The four positive real roots of the sextic in 

are the circumradii of the snub dodecahedron (U29), great snub icosidodecahedron (U57), great inverted snub icosidodecahedron (U69), and great retrosnub icosidodecahedron (U74).

Related polyhedra

Great pentagonal hexecontahedron 

The great pentagonal hexecontahedron (or great petaloid ditriacontahedron) is a nonconvex isohedral polyhedron and dual to the uniform great snub icosidodecahedron. It has 60 intersecting irregular pentagonal faces, 120 edges, and 92 vertices.

Proportions

Let  be the negative zero of the polynomial . Each face has three long and two short edges. The ratio  between the lengths of the long and the short edges is given by
. 
The dihedral angle equals . Part of each face lies inside the solid, hence is invisible in solid models. The other two zeroes of the polynomial  play a similar role in the description of the great inverted pentagonal hexecontahedron and the great pentagrammic hexecontahedron.

See also 
 List of uniform polyhedra
 Great inverted snub icosidodecahedron
 Great retrosnub icosidodecahedron

References

External links 
 
 

Uniform polyhedra